Wartenburg may refer to:

Places
Wartenburg (Kemberg), in the Wittenberg district, Saxony-Anhalt, Germany
Wartenburg in Ostpreußen, German name for Barczewo, Warmian-Masurian Voivodeship, Poland

People
Ludwig Yorck von Wartenburg
Paul Yorck von Wartenburg
Peter Yorck von Wartenburg

See also
Wartenberg (disambiguation)